is a railway station on the Rias Line in the village of Noda, Iwate, Japan, operated by the third-sector railway operator Sanriku Railway.

Lines

Station layout
Rikuchū-Noda Station has a single island platform serving two tracks. The station is staffed.

Platforms

Adjacent stations

History
Rikuchū-Noda Station opened on 20 July 1975 as a station on the Japanese National Railways (JNR) Kuji Line. On 1 April 1984, the station was transferred to the control of the third-sector Sanriku Railway. Minami-Rias Line, a portion of Yamada Line, and Kita-Rias Line constitute Rias Line on 23 March 2019. Accordingly, this station became an intermediate station of Rias Line.

Surrounding area
National Route 45
Rikuchū-Noda Roadside station
Noda Village Hall
Noda Post Office

See also
 List of railway stations in Japan

References

External links

  

Railway stations in Iwate Prefecture
Railway stations in Japan opened in 1975
Rias Line
Noda, Iwate